Uranium tetrafluoride is the inorganic compound with the formula UF4. It is a green solid  with an insignificant vapor pressure and low solubility in water. Uranium in its tetravalent (uranous) state is  important in various technological processes. In the uranium refining industry it is known as green salt.

Production
UF4 is prepared from UO2 in a fluidized bed by reaction with HF. The UO2 is derived from mining operations. Around 60,000 tonnes per year are prepared in this way annually. A common impurity is UO2F2. UF4 is susceptible to hydrolysis as well.

UF4 is formed by the reaction of UF6 with hydrogen gas in a vertical tube-type reactor. 
UF4 is less stable than the uranium oxides and reacts slowly with moisture at ambient temperature, forming UO2 and HF, the latter of which is very corrosive and toxic; it is thus less favourable for long-term disposal. The bulk density of UF4 varies from about 2.0 g/cm3 to about 4.5 g/cm3 depending on the production process and the properties of the starting uranium compounds.

A molten salt reactor design, a type of nuclear reactor where the working fluid is a molten salt, would use UF4 as the core material. UF4 is generally chosen over other salts because of the usefulness of the elements without isotope separation, better neutron economy and moderating efficiency, lower vapor pressure and better chemical stability.

Reactions
Uranium tetrafluoride reacts with fluorine, first to give uranium pentafluoride and then volatile UF6:
2UF4  +  F2  →  2UF5
2UF5  +  F2  →  2UF6

UF4 is reduced by magnesium to give the metal:
UF4  +  2Mg  →  U  + 2MgF2

It is oxidized to UF5 at room temperature and then, at 100°C, to the hexafluoride.

Structure
Like most metal fluorides, UF4 is a dense highly crosslinked inorganic polymer.  As established by X-ray crystallography, the U centres are eight-coordinate with square antiprismatic coordination spheres. The fluoride centres are doubly bridging.

Safety
Like all uranium salts, UF4 is toxic and thus harmful by inhalation, ingestion, and through skin contact.

See also
Praseodymium(IV) fluoride which has the same crystal structure

References of historical interest

References

External links

Uranium(IV) compounds
Nuclear materials
Fluorides
Actinide halides
Inorganic compounds